Działosza is a Polish coat of arms. Hińcza Rogow coat Działosza - Knight of Rogowa, treasurer court and crown [1] , who lived between the fourteenth and the fifteenth century, the late approx. 1416, mentioned include in the annals of Jan Dlugosz as one who in 1400, together with John Naszonem of Ostrowiec and Castellan Śrem John of Obichowa and team knight and fleet auxiliary, he was sent by King Władysława Jagiełłę with the message to Celje, Count Herman II Cylejskiego to the Polish behalf ruler ask his hand ward, countess Anna [2], [3]. Entrusted with the mission Hińcza comrades conscientiously fulfilled, as evidenced by the arrival of the young countess to Kraków [2] and her subsequent marriage z Jagiełłą.

In 1404 years he received a life sentence from the King Castle in Krzepice, along with the office of the governor Krzepicki [4] . From 14 December 1404 to 14 July 1406 was Castellan rozpierskim [5] .

In 1410, during the Battle of Grunwald Hińcza Rogow he was a member of the royal guard [1] . Ofka married, father of five children: three sons: Henry, James (zm.1431) and John and two daughters, Margaret wife of Przecław Kobylany and his wife Anne of Zygmunt Nowosielec. [6]

History

Blazon

Notable bearers
Notable bearers of this coat of arms include:

See also
 Polish heraldry
 Heraldry
 Coat of Arms

Polish coats of arms